The Sant'Anna di Stazzema massacre was a German war crime committed in the hill village of Sant'Anna di Stazzema in Tuscany, Italy, in the course of an operation against the Italian resistance movement during the Italian Campaign of World War II. On 12 August 1944 the Waffen-SS, with the help of the Brigate Nere, murdered about 560 local villagers and refugees, including more than a hundred children, and burned their bodies. These crimes have been defined as voluntary and organized acts of terrorism by the Military Tribunal of La Spezia and the highest Italian court of appeal.

Massacre

On the morning of 12 August 1944, German troops of the 2nd Battalion of SS Panzergrenadier Regiment 35 of 16th SS Panzergrenadier Division Reichsführer-SS, commanded by SS-Hauptsturmführer Anton Galler, entered the mountain village of Sant'Anna di Stazzema. With them came some fascists of the 36th Brigata Nera Benito Mussolini based in Lucca, dressed in German uniforms.

The soldiers immediately proceeded to round up villagers and refugees, locking up hundreds of them in several barns and stables, before systematically executing them. The killings were done mostly by shooting groups of people with machine guns or by herding them into basements and other enclosed spaces and tossing in hand grenades. At the 16th-century local church, the priest Fiore Menguzzo (awarded the Medal for Civil Valor posthumously in 1999) was shot at point-blank range, after which machine guns were then turned on some 100 people gathered there. In all, the victims included at least 107 children (the youngest of whom, Anna Pardini, was only 20 days old), as well as eight pregnant women (one of whom, Evelina Berretti, had her womb cut with a bayonet and her baby pulled out and killed separately).

After other people were killed through the village, their corpses were set on fire (at the church, the soldiers used its pews for a bonfire to dispose of the bodies). The livestock were also exterminated and the whole village was burned down. All this took three hours. The SS men then sat down outside the burning Sant'Anna and ate lunch.

Aftermath

After the war, the church was rebuilt. The Charnel House Monument and the Historical Museum of Resistance were both built nearby. Stations of the Cross illustrate scenes from the massacre along the trail from the church to the main memorial site—the National Park of Peace, founded in 2000. The massacre inspired the novel Miracle at St. Anna by James McBride, and Spike Lee's film of the same title that was based on it.

Prosecutions 

Apart from the divisional commander Max Simon, no one was prosecuted for this massacre until July 2004, when a trial of ten former Waffen-SS officers and NCOs living in Germany was held before a military court in La Spezia, Italy. On 22 June 2005, the court found the accused guilty of participation in the killings and sentenced them in absentia to life imprisonment:
 Werner Bruss (b. 1920, former SS-Unterscharführer),
 Alfred Concina (b. 1919, former SS-Unterscharführer),
 Ludwig Goering (b. 1923, former SS-Rottenführer who confessed to killing twenty women),
 Karl Gropler (b. 1923, former SS-Unterscharführer),
 Georg Rauch (b. 1921, former SS-Untersturmführer),
 Horst Richter (b. 1921, former SS-Unterscharführer),
 Alfred Schoneberg (b. 1921, former SS-Unterscharführer),
 Heinrich Schendel (b. 1922, former SS-Unterscharführer),
 Gerhard Sommer, (b. 1921, former SS-Untersturmführer), and
 Ludwig Heinrich Sonntag (b. 1924, former SS-Unterscharführer).

However, extradition requests from Italy were rejected by Germany. In 2012, German prosecutors shelved their investigation of 17 unnamed former SS soldiers (eight of whom were still alive) who were part of the unit involved in the massacre because of a lack of evidence. The statement said: "Belonging to a Waffen-SS unit that was deployed to Sant'Anna di Stazzema cannot replace the need to prove individual guilt. Rather, for every defendant it must be proven that he took part in the massacre, and in which form." The mayor of the village, Michele Silicani (a survivor who was 10 when the raid occurred), called the verdict "a scandal" and said he would urge Italy's justice minister to lobby Germany to reopen the case. German deputy foreign minister Michael Georg Link commented that "while respecting the independence of the German justice system," it was not possible "to ignore that such a decision causes deep dismay and renewed suffering to Italians, not just survivors and relatives of the victims."

See also

 Collective punishment
 List of massacres in Italy
 Marzabotto massacre
 Oradour-sur-Glane massacre

Notes

References

Further reading
 US NARA, Record Group 153, Judge Advocate General, War Crimes Branch, Cases filed 1944–1949, Location: 270/1/25/3-4, Entry 143, Box 527, Case 16–62 (Santa Anna).
 National Archives and Records Administration, RG 238, Office of the Chief of Counsel for War Crimes, Location: 190/10/34/25, Entry 2, Box 10, Case 16–62 (Santa Anna).
 Claudia Buratti/Giovanni Cipollini, Vite bruciate. La strage di Sant'Anna di Stazzema 1944–2005, Rome, 2006.
 Carlo Gentile, Politische Soldaten. Die 16. SS-Panzer-Grenadier-Division "Reichsführer-SS" in Italien 1944, in: Quellen und Forschungen aus italienischen Archiven und Bibliotheken, 81, 2001, pp. 529–561.
 Carlo Gentile, Sant'Anna di Stazzema, in: Gerd R. Ueberschär (ed.), Orte des Grauens. Verbrechen im Zweiten Weltkrieg, Darmstadt, 2003, pp. 231–236.
 Carlo Gentile, Le SS di Sant'Anna di Stazzema: azioni, motivazioni e profilo di una unità nazista, in: Marco Palla (ed.), Tra storia e memoria. 12 agosto 1944: la strage di Sant'Anna di Stazzema, Rome, 2003, pp. 86–117.

External links
 The National Park of Peace of Sant’Anna di Stazzema
 "A Day of Shame" for Germany, Deutsche Welle, 12 August 2004

1944 crimes in Italy
Massacres in 1944
Collective punishment
Modern history of Italy
Massacres in Italy
Nazi SS
Mass murder in 1944
Massacres in the Italian Social Republic
August 1944 events

de:Sant'Anna di Stazzema#Massaker